The 1989–90 Primeira Divisão was the 56th edition of top flight of Portuguese football. It started on 20 August 1989 with a match between Chaves and Penafiel, and ended on 20 May 1990. The league was contested by 18 clubs with Benfica as the defending champions.

Porto qualified for the 1990–91 European Cup first round, Estrela da Amadora qualified for the 1990–91 European Cup Winners' Cup first round, and Benfica, Sporting CP and Vitória de Guimarães qualified for the 1990–91 UEFA Cup first round; in opposite, Portimonense and Feirense were relegated to the Liga de Honra. Magnusson was the top scorer with 33 goals.

Promotion and relegation

Teams relegated to Liga de Honra
Espinho
Fafe
Farense
Leixões
Académico de Viseu

Espinho, Fafe, Farense, Leixões and Académico de Viseu were consigned to the Liga de Honra following their final classification in 1988–89 season.

Teams promoted from Liga de Honra
União da Madeira
Feirense
Tirsense

The other five teams were replaced by União da Madeira, Feirense and Tirsense from the Liga de Honra, as the league dropped from 20 to 18 teams.

Teams

Stadia and locations

Managerial changes

League standings

Results

Top goalscorers

Source: Foradejogo

Footnotes

External links
 Portugal 1989-90 - RSSSF (Jorge Miguel Teixeira)
 Portuguese League 1989/90 - footballzz.co.uk
 Portugal - Table of Honor - Soccer Library 

Primeira Liga seasons
Port
1989–90 in Portuguese football